Soveria Simeri is a comune and town in the province of Catanzaro in the Calabria region of southern Italy.

The economy is predominantly agricultural with a good development of the primary sector. Well-known are the productions of citrus fruits, olive oil, honey, meats, dairy products, and organic products. Craftsmanship activities include three laboratories of glassworks.

References

Cities and towns in Calabria